George Michael Savitsky (July 30, 1924 – September 4, 2012) was an American football offensive tackle in the National Football League for the Philadelphia Eagles.  

Born in New York City, Savitsky grew up in Camden, New Jersey and played football at Camden High School where he was captain of the undefeated squad in 1942.

He played college football at the University of Pennsylvania where he excelled as both an offensive and defensive tackle, and became the only four-year All American of the 20th century. At Penn, he was a member of Phi Sigma Kappa. During the summers of his college years, the versatile Savitsky taught swimming and diving at the Flanders Hotel pools in Ocean City, NJ. He was drafted by the Eagles in the fifth round of the 1947 NFL Draft.

Savitsky was inducted into the College Football Hall of Fame in 1991.

While at Penn, he helped to mentor fellow college All-Americans Tony Minisi and college and pro football Hall of Famer Chuck Bednarik. Due to the low pay scale in the NFL in the late 1940s, he retired from pro football and entered dental school; thereafter he enjoyed a long and successful career as a dentist in southern New Jersey. For years, Savitsky was a member of the "Mungermen," a group of former Penn players under Hall-of-Fame coach George Munger who gathered periodically on game days.  

A resident of Ocean City, New Jersey, he died of pneumonia in Somers Point, New Jersey in 2012 at the age of 88.

References

External links

1924 births
2012 deaths
All-American college football players
Camden High School (New Jersey) alumni
People from Ocean City, New Jersey
Players of American football from New York City
Players of American football from Camden, New Jersey
American football offensive tackles
Penn Quakers football players
Philadelphia Eagles players
College Football Hall of Fame inductees
Deaths from pneumonia in New Jersey